Santiria sarawakana is a species of plant in the family Burseraceae. It is a tree endemic to Borneo where it is confined to Sarawak.

References

sarawakana
Endemic flora of Borneo
Trees of Borneo
Flora of Sarawak
Vulnerable plants
Taxonomy articles created by Polbot